The United States Air Force's 221st Combat Communications Squadron (221 CBCS) is an Air National Guard combat communications unit located at Hensley Field, Grand Prairie, Texas.

Mission
Deploy, operate, and sustain command, control, communications and computer systems (C4) and support capabilities for Air Force and joint military operations under bare-base conditions. Promote public safety for the citizens of the State of Texas and to respond to state and local emergencies.

History
The 221st Combat Communications Squadron was originally organized as the 221st Radio Relay Squadron in July 1952. Its operational headquarters was the 251st Group at Springfield, Ohio, and the 136th Airlift Wing at Hensley Field supported it. Command of the unit was transferred to the 252d Group at Spokane, Washington in January 1963. In March 1968, the unit was re-designated the 221st Mobile Communications Squadron to more accurately reflect its mission. In June 1971 the 254th Mobile Communications Group was created at the 221st's station and became its operational headquarters.

Assignments

Major Command/Gaining Command
  Air National Guard/Air Combat Command (2018–Present)
  Air National Guard/Air Force Space Command (2008–2018)
  Air National Guard/Air Combat Command (1994–2008)
  Air National Guard/Tactical Air Command (1992–1994)
  Air National Guard/Air Force Communications Command (1952–1992)

Previous designations
  221st Mobile Communications Squadron (January 1963 – )
  221st Radio Relay Squadron (July 1952 – January 1963)

Bases stationed
  Hensley Field, Texas (2010–present)
  Garland, Texas (1952–2010)

Equipment Operated
 (???-Present)

Combat Communications 0221
Squadrons of the United States Air National Guard
Military units and formations in Texas